Trukhachyovo is a rural locality (a village) in Lavrovskoye Rural Settlement, Sudogodsky District, Vladimir Oblast, Russia. The population was 5 as of 2010.

Geography 
Trukhachyovo is located on the Sudogda River, 20 km north of Sudogda (the district's administrative centre) by road. Isakovo is the nearest rural locality.

References 

Rural localities in Sudogodsky District